Zinc transporter ZIP1 is a protein that in humans is encoded by the SLC39A1 gene.

The protein ZIP1 is responsible for the active transport of zinc into prostate cells. In many prostate cancers SLC39A1 is silenced causing prostate cancer cells to be low in zinc.

See also
 Solute carrier family

References

Further reading

Solute carrier family